Napialus is a genus of moths of the family Hepialidae. There are three described species, all endemic to China.

Species
Napialus hunanensis - Hunan
Napialus kulingi
Napialus chongquingensis - Chongqing

External links
Hepialidae genera

Hepialidae
Exoporia genera